Majokko Daisakusen (魔女っ子大作戦 meaning Witch Girl Battle), sometimes romanized as Majyokko Dai Sakusen, is a game released 4 February 1999 for the PlayStation. It was developed by the game developer Toys for Bob and published in Japan by Bandai.

On the cover it is subtitled with the English phrase Little witching mischiefs. It is a fighting and role-playing video game starring girls with magical powers. On episode 97 of internet interview show Matt Chat, creators Fred Ford and Paul Reiche described the unusual production style. The company were faxed design documents directly from Bandai which needed to be translated from Japanese before any of them could be implemented. The process was so laborious, the developers eventually turned off their fax machine in order to finish the game on schedule. The game used assets from the developer's previous titles, The Unholy War and Pandemonium!.

This game features magical girl characters from anime television series produced by Toei Animation from 1966 to 1981, and created by manga artists including Mitsuteru Yokoyama (Sally the Witch), Go Nagai (Cutie Honey), and Fujio Akatsuka (Himitsu no Akko-chan).

Cast
It is a crossover work that features many classic majokko characters as playable. These include:
Sally Yumeno from the 1966 anime Mahou Tsukai Sally
Atsuko Kagami from the 1969 anime Himitsu no Akko-chan
Chappy the Witch from the 1972 anime Mahō Tsukai Chappy
Honey Kisaragi from the 1973 anime Cutie Honey
Megu Kanzaki from the 1974 anime Majokko Megu-chan
Lunlun Flower from the 1979 anime Hana no Ko Lunlun
Lalabel from the 1980 anime Mahou Shoujo Lalabel

Collectibles

In addition to the game, Bandai also produced a series of collectible figures of the main cast called Little Witching Mischiefs DX gashapon, which included Gou Non, the title character's rival in Majokko Megu-chan (who is not a playable character in the game).

References

External links
 Opening movie (2011 and 2013 uploads) features a unique anime created that showcases all the girls alongside each other
 MAJOKKO TACTICS : LITTLE WITCHING MISCHIEFS a 2012 review
 Review of game
 Pictures of gashopon figurine

1999 video games
Crossover role-playing video games
Japan-exclusive video games
Magical girl video games
Bandai games
Video games based on anime and manga
Cutie Honey
PlayStation (console) games
PlayStation (console)-only games
Role-playing video games
Video games developed in the United States
Single-player video games
Toys for Bob games